Sangay Wangchuk (born 1983) is a Bhutanese long-distance runner who set a national record in the men's marathon at the 2009 World Championships in Athletics on August 22, 2009. Wangchuk's time of 2:47:55 broke the previous best of 3:00:17 set by Kencho Norbu on November 13, 2002 in Thimphu. Bhutan Today reported that Wangchuk, a member of Royal Bhutan Army, turned in a time of 2:52 at the Third Coronation Marathon in Wangdue Phodrang on May 23, 2010 but finished second to Pasang Pasang (2:44:21).

See also
 List of Bhutanese records in athletics
 National records in the marathon

References

External links
 

1983 births
Living people
Bhutanese male marathon runners
World Athletics Championships athletes for Bhutan